The 2019 USL League Two season is the 25th season of what was formerly the Premier Development League, and the first under the new brand. The regular season started on May 3 and ended on July 14. The Flint City Bucks won the final championship, having defeated Reading United AC 1–0 in extra time.

Changes from 2018

New teams

A total of 12 new member clubs join League Two for the 2019 season.

Moves
Michigan Bucks became Flint City Bucks after moving from Pontiac MI, to Flint MI.

Name changes
North County United renamed Treasure Coast Tritons
West Virginia Chaos renamed West Virginia Alliance FC
Carolina Dynamo renamed North Carolina Fusion U-23

On hiatus
Fresno FC U-23

Folded / left

Birmingham Hammers (disbanded to make way for Birmingham Legion FC in USL Championship)
Colorado Rapids U-23
Derby City Rovers
FC Cleburne
FC Tucson (moved to USL League One)
IMG Academy Bradenton
Lansing United (disbanded to make way for Lansing Ignite FC in USL League One)
Memphis City FC (disbanded to make way for Memphis 901 FC in USL Championship)
Myrtle Beach Mutiny
Next Academy Palm Beach
OKC Energy U23
South Georgia Tormenta FC (moved to USL League One, replaced by Tormenta FC 2)
SIMA Aguilas

Standings

Eastern Conference

Northeast Division

Mid Atlantic Division

South Atlantic Division

Southern Conference

Deep South Division

Southeast Division

Mid South Division

Central Conference

Great Lakes Division

Heartland Division

Western Conference

Northwest Division

Mountain Division

Southwest Division

Playoffs

Bold = winner

Conference Championships

The League Two Conference Championships will be held over the weekend of July 19–21. Matches will be played at: Whittier, CA (Western Conference, host FC Golden State Force); Reading, PA (Eastern Conference, host Reading United AC); Des Moines, IA (Central Conference, host Des Moines Menace); and Columbia, SC (Southern Conference, host SC United Bantams). The four conference champions will advance to the League Two semifinals.

Awards
 Most Valuable Player: Deri Corfe (OCN)
 Golden Boot: Deri Corfe (OCN) & Kyle Edwards (BVC)
 Golden Glove: Blake Mullen (WMA)
 Young (U20) Player of the Year: Kyle Ferguson (SCU)
 Coach of the Year: Alan McCann (REA)
 Goalkeeper of the Year: Robert Edwards (SCU)
 Defender of the Year: Lamine Conte (REA)

All-League and All-Conference Teams

Eastern Conference
F: Deri Corfe (OCN) *, Thibaut Jacquel (LBR), Donnett Sackie (VBU)
M: Jack Beer (MAN) *, Manuel Ferriol (LIR), Taylor Gray (TRI), Felipe Hideki (REA) *
D: Gideon Betz (LBR), Lamine Conte (REA) *, Friedrich Peter (VBU)
G: Blake Mullen (WMA)

Central Conference
F: Yuri Farkas (FCB), Sullivan Oliveira Silva (TBC), Gerit Wintermeyer (CHI) *
M: Giuseppe Barone (FCB), Jackson Dietrich (DAY), Jorge Guinovart (CIN), Nicolás Perea (DMM)
D: Reece Hands (CIN), Leon Jones (CHI), James Thomas (DMM) *
G: Jordan Bell (DMM)

Southern Conference
F: J.J. Donnelly (SGT), Leonardo Paiva (VIL) *, Jonathan Ricketts (DRW)
M: Adrian Billhardt (SGT) *, Luca Mayr (SGT) *, Kobe Perez (SGT), Harrison Roberts (SCU)
D: Artur De Luca (PCM), Shalom Dutey (CHE), Kyle Ferguson (SCU) *
G: Robert Edwards (SCU) *

Western Conference
F: Manuel Medina (SCS), Enoch Mushagalusa (CPS), Daniel Trejo (GSF)
M: Nabilai Kibunguchy (SFG), Julio Rubio (ABU), Shun Takano (VIC), Shizu Yohena (SDZ)
D: Ray Estrada (SCS), Jordan Haynes (TSS), Edward Venta-Yepes (CPS)
G: Albert Escuin (LAN)

* denotes All-League player

References

USL League Two seasons
2019 in American soccer leagues